Spidertracks is a privately held New Zealand based company specialising in the development of hardware and software for the general aviation industry. The company specialises in flight tracking, aviation communication, and flight data acquisition.

History 
Spidertracks was founded by James McCarthy in 2007 in the small rural town of Pohangina, just outside Palmerston North, New Zealand. Following the death of high-profile businessman Michael Erceg in a helicopter crash in 2005, Erceg's downed aircraft was not located for two-weeks due to the failure of an Emergency Locator Transmitter (ELT).

McCarthy and some associates saw the opportunity to develop a lightweight, portable, 'real-time' GPS tracking device for the aviation industry.

The team developed a device known as a 'Spider' – a small device that plugs into an aircraft's auxiliary power outlet and is mounted in the cockpit.

Information such the aircraft's location, altitude, speed, and direction were transmitted via the Iridium satellite network every two minutes to the Spidertracks software platform. The founders claimed this offered a much more reliable way to locate an aircraft in an emergency situation.

Spider Tracks Limited was registered with the New Zealand Companies Office on 20 February 2007.

In 2020, Spidertracks launched their latest hardware device – 'Spider X'. According the Spidertracks, in addition to the real-time tracking and communication functions of previous models, the device is able to record and wirelessly transmit AHRS data to the Spidertracks cloud-based platform. The flight data is then processed post-flight to enable a 3D virtual flight replay and reporting on specific events or safety violations. Spidertracks claim this provides a low-cost, simple solution for Flight Data Monitoring and Flight Operations Quality Assurance for the General Aviation industry. 

In March 2022, investment firm Arcadea Group acquired a 95% shareholding of Spidertracks for an undisclosed sum.

Locations 
Spidertracks' head office is in Auckland, New Zealand, with a secondary office in Parker, Colorado. The company also claims to employ staff across the world.

References 

Aviation companies
Companies of New Zealand
New Zealand companies established in 2017
Software companies established in 2017
Software companies of New Zealand